The UCI ProTour Eindhoven Team Time Trial was an annual road bicycle race held in Eindhoven, Netherlands. Each team had six riders. In 2006, team size expanded to eight.

Conceived as part of the UCI ProTour in 2005, it was open to the 20 ProTour teams and 5 wildcard teams selected by the organisers. It was held immediately after the Ster Elektro Toer, a four-day race on the UCI Europe Tour.

In early 2008 Eindhoven ended involvement in the event. The UCI said it would be replaced by another to be decided. In 2012, the men's team time trial was introduced at the UCI Road World Championships.

Winners

References

External links
 Official Website

 
UCI ProTour races
Cycle races in the Netherlands
Recurring sporting events established in 2005
2005 establishments in the Netherlands
Recurring sporting events disestablished in 2007
Defunct cycling races in the Netherlands
2007 disestablishments in the Netherlands
Cycling in Eindhoven